Clarence F. Walker Lake is a 239-acre (0.97 km²) reservoir, formed by a dam and used for flood control and recreation. It is located in Adams Township, Snyder County, Pennsylvania near the town of Troxelville. The lake and shoreline are owned and managed by the Pennsylvania Fish and Boat Commission (PFBC) for recreational fishing and boating.
Fish species present include northern pike, largemouth bass, walleye, black crappie, and bluegill.

Walker Lake is located on the North Branch Middle Creek, which is a tributary to Middle Creek within the Susquehanna River basin.
North Branch Middle Creek was impounded in 1970 creating the 239 acre (0.97 km²) lake, which drains a 19 mi² (49 km²) watershed consisting primarily of forested (57%) and agricultural (39%) areas.

References
 Penna. Fisheries Management Field Report: Walker Lake
 PFBC: C. F. Walker Lake
  
 Inspection Report
 Water Quality Standards Review

Protected areas of Snyder County, Pennsylvania
Reservoirs in Pennsylvania
Bodies of water of Snyder County, Pennsylvania